Fibes, Oh Fibes! is a Swedish funk rock band that rose to fame in early 2004.

The trio, from Gothenburg on the west coast of Sweden, was formed in 2001. Their first release was a self-titled EP in 2003. The band name is from drum company Fibes Drums, of which the band had a beloved drumset in its early career.

In May 2004, their first album, Still Fresh, was released. In August 2006, they released a second album, Emotional. In autumn 2009, the band released the album 1987, on which they collaborated with Gary Kemp, Pontus Winnberg, Petter Winberg and Oskar Linnros. The album also contains duets with Björn Skifs and Kim Wilde. The album won Pop Album of the Year at the 2010 Grammis Awards. 

Fibes, Oh Fibes! take their inspiration from the soft rock genre of artists like Phil Collins, Lionel Richie and Toto.

Members
 Christian Olsson - vocals and piano
 Mathias Nilsson - guitars
 Edvin Edvinsson  - bass guitar

Discography

Albums
2001: Fibes, Oh Fibes! (EP)
2004: Still Fresh
2006: Emotional (#25 Sweden)
2009: 1987 (#8 Sweden)
2012: Album (#20 Sweden)

Singles
2009: "Love Child" (#56 Sweden)
2009: "Run to You" (credited to Fibes, Oh Fibes! with Kim Wilde) (#24 Sweden)

References

External links
 Official Website
 Fibes, Oh Fibes! elsewhere
 Fibes, Oh Fibes! on Last.fm

Musical groups from Gothenburg
English-language singers from Sweden